Calaburras Lighthouse (Spanish: Faro de Calaburras) is a lighthouse located at the coastal point known as Punta de Calaburras near Mijas, Málaga province, in Spain.

The station was the first air/sea lighthouse in Spain and was built in 1863 and rebuilt in 1928. It is the main beacon of the province. The light is used by ships and planes navigating the Strait of Gibraltar.

Its signal is automatic and electric since 1949. Its light signal flashes every 5 seconds and its maximum visibility range is 28 nautical miles.

See also

 List of lighthouses in Spain

References

External links

 Comisión de faros 
 Autoridad Portuaria de Málaga

Lighthouses completed in 1863
Lighthouses in Andalusia